Devil's Dice is a 1926 American silent romance film directed by Tom Forman and starring Barbara Bedford, Robert Ellis and Josef Swickard.

Cast
 Barbara Bedford as Helen Paine 
 Robert Ellis as Larry Bannon 
 Josef Swickard as Judge Casper Paine 
 Tom B. Forman as Oberfield 
 James Gordon as Martin Godfrey 
 Jack Richardson as Weary

References

Bibliography
 Munden, Kenneth White. The American Film Institute Catalog of Motion Pictures Produced in the United States, Part 1. University of California Press, 1997.

External links

1926 films
1920s romance films
American romance films
Films directed by Tom Forman
American silent feature films
1920s English-language films
1920s American films